Baroiyarhat is a town and paurashava (municipality) in Chittagong District of Chittagong Division.

References

Populated places in Chittagong District